John Leofric Stocks DSO (26 October 1882 – 13 June 1937) was a British philosopher and was briefly Vice Chancellor of the University of Liverpool in 1937.

Biography
Stocks was born the sixth of twelve children to John Edward Stocks, the vicar of Market Harborough, Leicestershire.

He was educated at Rugby School and Corpus Christi College, Oxford and graduated in 1903. In 1906, he was an elected fellow and tutor of St. John's College, Oxford. Except for war service, he remained there until 1924. 

Stocks served in the British Army with the King's Royal Rifle Corps during the First World War, and he was awarded the Distinguished Service Order for gallantry at Beaucourt. In 1924, he was elected professor of philosophy at the University of Manchester, and, in 1936, he was appointed vice-chancellor of the University of Liverpool.

His professional philosophical interests were in Aristotelian studies and Epicureanism. In fact, he was president of the Aristotelian Society. He edited the Leaders of Philosophy book series (Ernest Benn Ltd.). 

He married Mary Danvers Brinton, who was later Baroness Stocks, with whom he had a son and two daughters. Stocks died on a visit to Swansea in 1937. Stocks was also a versatile sportsman and played rugby, hockey and cricket.

Bibliography

Written by John Leofric Stocks
 The Old Town Hall Library of Leicester (Corporation of Leicester, 1919). Joint authors: Cecil Deedes and J. E. Stocks.
 Aristotle's Definition of the Human Good (Blackwell, 1919)
 Patriotism and the Super-State (The Swarthmore Press and Harcourt, Brace & Howe, 1920; book series: International Relations Series)
 The Voice of the People (Wells Gardner, Darton & CO., Ltd., 1920)
 Aristotlelianism (Marshall Jones Company. 1925; book series: Our Debt to Greece and Rome)
 An Introduction to Philosophy (Ernest Benn Ltd., 1929: Benn's Sixpenny Library)
 The Limits of Purpose (1932)
 Time, Cause and Eternity (Macmillan, 1938)
 Reason and Intuition, and Other Essays (Oxford University Press, 1939)
 Morality and Purpose (Schocken Books, 1969; book series: Studies in Ethics and the Philosophy of Religion)

Translated by John Leofric Stocks
 De Caelo (Aristotle's On the Heavens) (Oxford University Press, 1922)

References

External links

 
 

1882 births
1937 deaths
Military personnel from Leicestershire
People from Market Harborough
20th-century English philosophers
British Army personnel of World War I
Companions of the Distinguished Service Order
King's Royal Rifle Corps officers
Spouses of life peers
Vice-Chancellors of the University of Liverpool
Presidents of the Aristotelian Society